Toxicoscordion nuttallii (Nuttall's death camas, death camas, poison camas, poison sego) is a species of poisonous plant native to the south-central part of the United States (Arkansas, Oklahoma, Tennessee, Missouri, Louisiana, Mississippi, Kansas, and Texas).

Toxicoscordion nuttallii is a bulb-forming herb up to 75 cm tall. One plant can have as many as 60 cream-colored flowers.

References

External links
The Meadow Text: Iralee Barnard Design: Jim Mason: Nuttall's Death-camas Toxicoscordion nuttallii photos, short description, ecological information
Lady Bird Johnson Wild flower Center, University of Texas, Austin, Zigadenus nuttallii (A. Gray) S. Watson Nuttall's deathcamas, Death Camas, Poison onion, Nuttall's death camas
Посещений страницы: 50056 ЗИГАДЕНУС (Zigadenus = Anticlea)  in Russian with color photos

nuttallii
Flora of the North-Central United States
Flora of the Southeastern United States
Flora of Texas
Flora without expected TNC conservation status